I Was a Mail Order Bridegroom is the tenth solo album by Australian guitarist and songwriter Ed Kuepper recorded in 1995 and released on the Hot label initially as a mail order only release.

Reception
The Allmusic review by Ned Raggett awarded the album 4 stars and states "I Was a Mail Order Bridegroom is one of Ed Kuepper's finest releases, his equivalent of an MTV Unplugged appearance but many times better than the usually dull efforts that implies... Perhaps the best thing about this album is that every song sounds like the best thing Kuepper has ever done while it's playing — high praise, perhaps, but it's the easiest way to capture the disc's lovely, entrancing spirit".

Track listing
All compositions by Ed Kuepper except as indicated
 "When She's Down" - 3:39
 "The Way I Made You Feel" - 4:18
 "The Cockfighter" - 2:59
 "Little Fiddle" - 4:40
 "Electrical Storm" - 5:06
 "I'm with You" - 2:56
 "There's Nothing Natural" - 2:56
 "Messin' with the Kid" (Kuepper, Chris Bailey) - 4:50
 "Ill Wind" - 5:51
 "The Seeker" (Pete Townshend) - 3:48
 "Everything I've Got Belongs to You" - 4:25
 "La Di Doh" - 4:54
 "Ring of Fire" (June Carter, Merle Kilgore) - 3:45
 "Black Ticket Day" - 3:47
 "So Close to Certainty" - 3:46
 "Teenage Idol" (J. Lewis) - 1:42
Recorded at Electric Avenue, Sydney, Australia in early 1995.

Personnel
Ed Kuepper - vocals, acoustic guitar

References

Hot Records albums
Ed Kuepper albums
1995 albums